Woman, Life, Freedom or Woman, Life, Liberty is a popular political Kurdish slogan used in both the Kurdish independence and democratic confederalist movements. The slogan became a rallying cry during the protests which occurred in Iran as a response to the death of Mahsa Amini.

Origin 

The origin of the slogan can be traced to the Kurdish freedom movement of the late twentieth century. The first time that the slogan was used was by members of the Kurdish women's movement, a part of the Kurdish freedom movement which was founded on grassroots activism in response to persecution from the governments of Iran, Iraq, Turkey and Syria. It was popularized further by Kurdish figures such as Abdullah Öcalan, in his anti-capitalist and anti-patriarchal writings. Since its first use, the slogan has been used by members of Kurdish organisations and those outside of the Kurdish movement.

Early Kurdish use 
The slogan is associated with Jineology and is said to have been coined by Abdullah Öcalan, the leader of the Kurdistan Workers' Party (PKK). The slogan marked the political activities of Kurdish women in the 2000s and was considered attractive because of its spelling, rhythm and connotational significance. The slogan was also used among Kurds of the Women's Protection Units (YPJ) in the war against the Islamic State (ISIS).

Spread around the world 
The slogan was first coined by Kurdish women fighters and then became popular in other protests around the globe. in such a way that on 25 November 2015, it was used in the gatherings held on the occasion of the International Day for the Elimination of Violence against Women in several European countries.

Afghanistan 

On September 20th, 2022, the slogan was chanted by Afghan women in a protest in support of Women protesting in Iran.

France 
In 2018, during Cannes Film Festival, the cast of Girls of the Sun chanted "jin jiyan azadî". The slogan was later printed in Persian on the first page of France's Libération in September 2022 following the protests for the death of Mahsa Amini.

Iran 

The first use of the slogan "Woman, Life, Freedom" goes back to series of protests following the Death of Mahsa Amini in September 2022. The slogan was first chanted in Amini's funeral in Saqqez and then was heard in the initial protests in Sanandaj after the funeral. On 21 September, the slogan was chanted by students at University of Tehran, and by protesters around the country in the following days. On 28 September and the continuation of protests, students at Shiraz University of Medical Sciences used the slogan in their protests along with a new, similar slogan: "Woman, Life, Freedom; Man, Homeland, Prosperity".

Following the expansion of Iranian protests to other cities of the world, rallies were held in different cities with protesters using the slogan "Women, Life, Freedom" along with other slogans. Due to its expansion to cities around the world, and extensive coverage on foreign media, French newspaper Libération used an image of Iran protests with the slogan on the top in Persian followed by its French translation. It was also used at the outro of the lyrics for the song "Baraye" by Shervin Hajipour, who was detained in police custody following worldwide acclaim for the song. The song "Baraye" was later sung in the global protests for Iran on October 1, 2022, in approximately 150 cities around the world.

The movement has been given a 12-point manifesto. Iranian Democracy Movement § Trade Unions Joint Charter with over 20 trade unions, student groups, and feminist groups as signatories.

Turkey 

This slogan has been repeatedly used in Turkey by Saturday Mothers. The slogan was also chanted by Turkish protesters in Turkey, when they gathered to protest in front of the embassy of the Islamic Republic of Iran on 21 September 2022.

Reception 

 Iranian sociologist Taghi Azadarmaki, stated that the slogan is "one of the most rooted desires of the middle class".
 Iranian sociologist Farhad Khosrokhavar considers the slogan as "a new shot in the sequence of Iranian civil protests".
 Sociologist Mehrdad Darvishpour believes that the slogan is "Challenging the violent patriarchal, deadly and authoritarian ruling ideology".
 Iranian-American politic analyst Karim Sadjadpour sees the slogan "Woman, Life, Freedom" as the counterpoint of the government.
 Mohammad Fazeli, Iranian sociologist and professor of sociology believes that in this slogan, woman has a symbolic face and demonstrates the hatred of violence.

Response 
 German Foreign Minister Annalena Baerbock Protests for Women's Rights with Banners of "Jin, Jiyan, Azadî" at the Party Committee.
 A Swedish member of the European Parliament Abir Al-Sahlani cuts hair in the European Parliament during a speech in solidarity with Kurdish women in Iran and taking a pair of scissors, she said “Jin, Jiyan, Azadî”.
 Finnish-US Kurdish singer Helly Luv released song of Jin, Jiyan, Azadî.
 Iranian-Dutch singer Sevdaliza released a song named "Woman Life Freedom زن زندگی آزادی".

See also 
 UN Commission for the Status of Women
 For Freedoms
 Islamic Penal Code
 Vital Voices

References

External links 

Egalitarianism
Political campaigns
Social justice
Political catchphrases
Mottos
Mahsa Amini protests
 
Kurdish words and phrases
Women in Afghanistan
Women in France
Women in Iran
Women in Turkey